Zaw Ka Ka Nay The is a 2009 Burmese drama film, directed by Mee Pwar starring Nay Toe, Nandar Hlaing, Pearl Win, Nyunt Win and Heavy Phyo. Mee Pwar won the Best Director Award and Diramore won the Best Music Award in 2009 Myanmar Motion Picture Academy Awards for this film.

Cast
Nay Toe as Zawgyi
Nandar Hlaing as Myint Zu
Pearl Win as Ma Lay Nge
Nyunt Win as U Tin Maung
Heavy Phyo as Mg Thar Cho

References

2009 films
2000s Burmese-language films
Burmese drama films
Films shot in Myanmar
2009 drama films